Palace of Desire, also known as Daming Gong Ci (literally "Ci of  the Daming Palace"), is a Chinese television series based on the life of Princess Taiping, a daughter of China's only female emperor, Wu Zetian. Directed by Li Shaohong and Zeng Nianping, the series starred Chen Hong, Zhou Xun, Gua Ah-leh and Winston Chao in the leading roles. It was first broadcast on CCTV-8 in mainland China on 30 March 2000. The scriptwriter used extremely poetic and theatrical language for lines.

Plot
This story is set during the Tang Dynasty, spanning the reign of Emperor Gaozong, Wu Zetian, Emperor Zhongzong, and Emperor Ruizong.

Princess Taiping was born to Empress Wu and Emperor Gaozong of Tang. She was pampered and doted on by her mother, and free from the struggles that her brothers face. The innocent princess fell in love with Xue Shao, a commoner she met outside of the palace. She was determined to marry him, and Empress Wu allowed for their marriage. Xue Shao already had a wife and refused to marry Princess Taiping. Empress Wu then murdered Xue Shao's wife so the daughter she dearly loved would find happiness. Xue Shao was saddened and committed suicide in front of Princess Taiping. That was the moment when Princess Taiping realized the horror of her mother's power.

After her mother became the Emperor, Princess Taiping withheld great power regarding politics. The princess decided to be rebellious and remarried to Wu Sansi's cousin, Wu Youji. Wu Youji was kind and harmless, but the princess wasn't content with her life. Wu Youji was known for conducting a special kind of medicine and gained the favor of Wu Zetian. This medicine also led him to have an affair by mistake. He committed suicide out of guilt towards Princess Taiping. After two failed marriages, the widowed princess was disillusioned with her identity.

One day, she met a man who looked exactly like Xue Shao. His name was Zhang Yizhi, and he would change her life. She fell in love with him, but Wu Zetian saw through Zhang Yizhi's motives. He was a womanizer that took advantage of others to benefit himself and Wu Zetian forced him to leave Princess Taiping. Zhang Yizhi became Wu Zetian's lover, to the horror of the princess. Once again, she felt lonely and depressed longing for love.

Eventually, Wu Zetian loses her power after a decade of politics struggles. Before she dies, she resolves her misunderstandings with her daughter, and the two embrace each other one last time. After her mother's death, Princess Taiping becomes ambitious about politics. This leads to conflicts with her sister-in-law, Lady Wei. Lady Wei wanted to be the next Wu Zetian and she was trusted and loved by her husband, Emperor Zhongzong. This trust led to his demise, as he was poisoned by his daughter, Princess Anle. Princess Anle and her mother Lady Wei were corrupt and Princess Taiping couldn't bear witnessing the destruction of her family.

Princess Taiping overthrows Lady Wei and Princess Anle, and returns power to her brother. Her life is peaceful, until Xue Shao's son Xue Chongjian suggests her to take the throne. Xue Chongjian secretly poisons a prince named Li Chongmao and Li Dan, Princess Taiping's brother and the current Emperor. However, the plan is revealed to Li Longji, Li Dan's son and the nephew of Princess Taiping. She tries to assassinate him, but he survives. Li Longji reveals that his feelings for her are greater than an aunt-nephew relationship. He loved her for twenty years, but Princess Taiping only loved him as an nephew. She was already disillusioned with palace life and politics. After she reminisced her bitter life as a princess, Princess Taiping committed suicide in the Daming Palace.

Cast 
 Chen Hong as Princess Taiping
 Zhou Xun as young Princess Taiping
 Gua Ah-leh as Wu Zetian
 Winston Chao as Xue Shao / Zhang Yizhi
 Li Zhixing as Emperor Gaozong of Tang
 Shen Junyi as Wu Sansi
 Fu Biao as Wu Youji
 Guo Donglin as Li Xian (Emperor Zhongzong of Tang)
 Jia Ni as Lady Wei
 Hu Jing as Wei Xiang'er (young Lady Wei)
 Li Bingbing as Princess Anle
 He Lin as Lady of Wei
 Liu Dong as Li Hong
 Sun Bin as Li Xian
 Wang Tao as Li Dan (Emperor Ruizong of Tang)
 Yuan Shilong as young Li Dan
 Gao Dongping as Zhang Changzong
 Wu Jun as Li Longji (Emperor Xuanzong of Tang)
 Zhao Yi as Xue Huaiyi
 Fu Heng as Wu Chengsi
 Zhang Ping as Ming Qingyuan
 Li Aijun as Cui Ti
 Lei Ming as Xue Shao's father
 Gao Fang as Xue Shao's mother
 Lin Xin as Wet Nurse Chun
 Yang Yuting as Jinniang
 Tan Xiaoyan as Lady Ru
 Gong Lijun as Lady of Han
 Cong Peixin as Li Yifu
 Zheng Zhong as Qapaghan Qaghan
 Zhang Zhenyuan as Zhou Xing
 Yan Huaili as Pei Yan
 Zhang Chunian as Deshun
 Guan Zongxiang as Lu Haoweng

Soundtrack 

The music for the series was composed by Lin Hai (林海). In 2011 China Scientific And Cultural Audio-Video Publishing House (中国科学文化音像出版社) released an extended version of the original soundtrack.

Track list (2003 version)

Track list (2011 version)

Awards

External links 
 
  Palace of Desire on Sina.com

2000 Chinese television series debuts
Television series set in the Tang dynasty
Television series set in the Zhou dynasty (690–705)
Works about Wu Zetian
Mandarin-language television shows
Chinese historical television series
Television shows set in Xi'an
Television series set in the 7th century
Cultural depictions of Wu Zetian